Paitoon Chulatuppa (born 5 January 1942) is a Thai sailor. He competed in the Tempest event at the 1972 Summer Olympics.

References

External links
 

1942 births
Living people
Paitoon Chulatuppa
Paitoon Chulatuppa
Sailors at the 1972 Summer Olympics – Tempest
Place of birth missing (living people)
Paitoon Chulatuppa